In mathematics, the Christ–Kiselev maximal inequality is a maximal inequality for filtrations, named for mathematicians Michael Christ and Alexander Kiselev.

Continuous filtrations
  (continuity)

For example,  with measure  that has no pure points and

 

is a continuous filtration.

Continuum version
Let  and suppose  is a bounded linear operator for finite . Define the Christ–Kiselev maximal function

where . Then  is a bounded operator, and

Discrete version
Let , and suppose  is a bounded linear operator for finite .

 

Then  is a bounded operator.

Here, .

The discrete version can be proved from the continuum version through constructing .

Applications
The Christ–Kiselev maximal inequality has applications to the Fourier transform and convergence of Fourier series, as well as to the study of Schrödinger operators.

References 

Mathematical analysis
Inequalities
Measure theory